Justice Wade may refer to:

Gary R. Wade (fl. 1970s–2010s), associate justice of the Tennessee Supreme Court
Lester A. Wade (1889–1966), associate justice of the Utah Supreme Court